The 2005 Bryant Bulldogs football team represented Bryant University as a member of Northeast-10 Conference (NE-10) during the 2005 NCAA Division II football season. The Bulldogs were led by second-year head coach Marty Fine and played their home games at Bulldog Stadium. They finished the season 7–3 overall and 6–3 in NE-10 play.

Schedule

References

Bryant
Bryant Bulldogs football seasons
Bryant Bulldogs football